This article details the Bradford Bulls rugby league football club's 1999 season, the 4th season of the Super League era.

Season review

February 1999

The Bulls kicked off their 1999 season with a huge bang as they thrashed Workington Town 92–0 in the Challenge Cup. They progressed through to the quarter-finals by defeating Wakefield Trinity Wildcats 26–8.

March 1999

Bradford won their first Super League game of the year 18–6 against Sheffield Eagles. The Bulls progressed to the semi-finals of the Challenge Cup by beating Warrington Wolves 52–16. Bradford's winning streak continued with an 8–3 win over Hull Sharks. Bradford's first loss of the season came in the Challenge Cup semi-final as they were beaten 23–10 by arch-rivals Leeds Rhinos.

April 1999

The Bulls didn't have to wait long to avenge the semi-final loss, the very next week Bradford beat Leeds 18–14 in front of a 16,000 plus crowd at Odsal which meant the Bulls retained 2nd place in the table. After the high of beating Leeds the Bulls came crashing back down to earth after suffering a 58–14 loss to St. Helens. However they soon got their season back on track with a 26–16 win against Wakefield Trinity Wildcats at home, they followed this win with another victory, this time a 22–14 win away at Warrington Wolves. Bradford finished the month with a 20–2 win against fellow Yorkshire team Halifax Blue Sox.

May 1999

Bradford kicked May off with an 18–18 draw against Castleford Tigers which was the Bulls first draw in the Super League history. The following week Bradford hammered Salford City Reds with a 46–6 victory, soon after the Bulls beat Gateshead Thunder 22–12 at the Thunderdome. In one of the Bulls best performances of the year they beat Wigan Warriors 19–2, keeping the Super League champions try less. Bradford's dominance throughout May ended with a 22–20 win against Huddersfield Giants.

June 1999

Bradford kicked off June with an outstanding 52–2 win against Sheffield Eagles. The Bulls great run of form continued with an astonishing 74–12 win against London Broncos at Odsal Stadium, however they were soon brought to a low as they crashed to a 45–16 loss against arch rivals Leeds Rhinos. They didn't let this heavy defeat get them down as they took St. Helens apart the following week and won 46–22 ensuring that they stayed at the top of the league.

July 1999

The Bulls beat Wakefield Trinity Wildcats 36–8 in the first game in July, this win kept them at the top of the table. They followed this win with a clinical performance against Huddersfield Giants and came out 26–0 winners. Bradford's good run of results continued with an outstanding 56–6 win against Warrington Wolves. They travelled to Halifax and beat them 34–20 in a tough match to make sure their status as league leaders was intact, this continued with a 24–22 win against Castleford Tigers. The next match saw the Bulls beat London Broncos 19–16 in a hard fought game at Welford Road.

August 1999

Bradford started off August with a comprehensive 58–20 win over Salford City Reds. Gateshead Thunder was the next to lose in the Bulls run of impressive victories as Bradford beat them 30–14. Bradford's long run of successive wins was brought to and end as Wigan Warriors beat the Bulls 14–0 which makes it the first time in the Super League history that the Bulls have been scoreless in a game. However they bounced back a week later to thrash Sheffield Eagles 52–4. Bradford then beat Hull Sharks 44–12 to ensure that they stayed at the top of the league and would be Super League minor premiers for the 1999 season.

September 1999

Bradford beat their arch-rivals Leeds Rhinos 19–18 with a last minute drop goal from Michael Withers in front of a 24,020 crowd at Odsal Stadium. The Bulls finished off the regular season with a 25–16 loss to St. Helens however Bradford were awarded the League Leader's Shield for finishing top of the league. Bradford once again faced St. Helens but this time in the Qualifying Semi-final, Bradford beat the Saints 40–4 with Henry Paul pulling the strings and contributing by scoring 2 tries. However Saints were to get their revenge as they beat Bradford 8–6 in a hard fought Grand Final with Henry Paul scoring all 6 of Bradford's points.

1999 milestones

CCR4: Nathan McAvoy scored his 1st four-try haul and 1st hat-trick for the Bulls.
CCR4: Michael Withers scored his 1st try, 1st four-try haul and 1st hat-trick for the Bulls.
CCR4: Nick Zisti and Stuart Fielden scored their 1st tries for the Bulls.
CCR5: Henry Paul scored his 1st try for the Bulls.
Round 1: Henry Paul kicked his 1st goal for the Bulls.
CCQF: Tevita Vaikona scored his 1st four-try haul and 1st hat-trick for the Bulls.
CCQF: David Boyle and Scott Naylor scored their 1st tries for the Bulls.
Round 5: Steve McNamara kicked his 300th goal for the Bulls.
Round 9: Leon Pryce scored his 1st try for the Bulls.
Round 11: Robbie Paul scored his 50th try and reaches 200 points for the Bulls.
Round 11: Paul Deacon kicked his 1st drop-goal for the Bulls.
Round 13: Jamie Peacock scored his 1st try for the Bulls.
Round 13: Steve McNamara reached 700 points for the Bulls.
Round 14: Paul Deacon reached 100 points for the Bulls.
Round 14: Mike Forshaw scored his 1st hat-trick for the Bulls.
Round 15: Nathan McAvoy scored his 2nd four-try haul and 2nd hat-trick for the Bulls.
Round 18: James Lowes reached 200 points for the Bulls.
Round 18: Phil Howlett scored his 1st try for the Bulls.
Round 20: Brian McDermott scored his 1st hat-trick for the Bulls.
Round 20: James Lowes scored his 50th try for the Bulls.
Round 24: Steve McNamara reached 800 points for the Bulls.
Round 27: Brian McDermott scored his 25th try and reached 100 points for the Bulls.
Round 28: Michael Withers scored his 2nd four-try haul and 2nd hat-trick for the Bulls.
Round 29: Tevita Vaikona scored his 25th try and reached 100 points for the Bulls.
Round 29: Michael Withers kicked his 1st drop-goal for the Bulls.
Qualifying Semi-final: Henry Paul reached 100 points for the Bulls.

Table

1999 fixtures and results

1999 JJB Sports Super League

Challenge Cup

Playoffs

1999 squad statistics

 Appearances and Points include (Super League, Challenge Cup and Play-offs) as of 2012.

References

External links
Bradford Bulls Website
Bradford Bulls in T&A
Bradford Bulls on Sky Sports
Bradford on Super League Site
Red, Black And Amber
BBC Sport-Rugby League 

Bradford Bulls seasons
Bradford Bulls